Karl Johans gate is the main street of the city of Oslo, Norway. The street was named in honor of King Charles III John, who was also King of Sweden as Charles XIV John.
	
Karl Johans gate is a composite of several older streets that used to be separate thoroughfares. The eastern section was part of Christian IV's original city near the ramparts surrounding the city. When the ramparts were removed to make way for Oslo Cathedral, three separate sections eventually became Østre Gade.

The wider western section was built during the 1840s as an avenue connecting the newly erected Norwegian Royal Palace with the rest of the city. In 1852, it was named Karl Johans gate in honor of the recently deceased king. His equestrian statue, by sculptor Brynjulf Bergslien, was later erected during 1875 in front of the Royal Palace. When the Norwegian parliament building was completed in 1866 at the junction of the two formerly separate streets, the two streets were joined and the whole length was named Karl Johans gate.

In its current route, it connects Oslo Central Station, the main railroad station in Oslo, and the Royal Palace. The route changes  its direction and width slightly halfway between these two points, at Egertorget, a square at the intersection of Karl Johans gate and Øvre Slottsgate. This is the highest point and, here, both ends of the street may be seen. The street is 1,020 metres long; in addition there are 300 metres of direct extensions, Palace Hill (Slottsbakken) and Palace Place (Slottsplassen).

The street includes many of Oslo's tourist attractions: In addition to the Royal Palace, Central Station and Stortinget, there are the National Theatre, the old University Buildings, the Palace Park and the pond ("Spikersuppa") at Eidsvolls plass, which serves as a skating rink in winter. Oslo Cathedral's lower end is surrounded by the Bazaar Market (Basarene ved Oslo domkirke), which is integrated with the historic Fire Watch (Brannvakta) that served as Oslo's main fire station from 1860 until 1939.

See also
Oslo Astrological Clock
Sentrum, Oslo

References

Streets in Oslo
Charles XIV John